The Ottawa Youth Orchestra Academy (OYOA) is a registered Canadian charitable organization that comprises two full orchestras, eight instrumental ensembles for strings, winds, brass and harp, a beginner's and pre-school program, and instruction in music theory and history through Grade 3 in the RCM Syllabus. Over the past years, these programs have shown increasing enrollment, reaching over 300 students. Furthermore, members of the Ottawa Youth Orchestra regularly qualify for the National Youth Orchestra of Canada.

The OYOA has ongoing partnerships with the National Capital Commission and the Ottawa Symphony Orchestra.

History
The Ottawa Youth Orchestra was founded in 1960 for the purpose of bringing together talented young musicians of the Ottawa area for the purpose of gaining experience in ensemble and orchestral playing through weekly rehearsals and performances before live audiences.  Since then the orchestra had been active, usually presenting four public concerts each season.  Each year auditions were held in September and rehearsals began immediately after.  The Orchestra operated as a night school class under the Continuing Education Division of the Ottawa Board of Education and a nominal fee was charged.  The membership was limited to those from 12 to 24 years of age.  The demand was such that in 1971 an Associate Youth Orchestra was founded under the direction of J.K. Lussenburg with rehearsals being held at Canterbury High School.  In 1980, the Associate Ottawa Youth Orchestra was conducted by Dwight Rudisuela.

In 1982, John Gomez and colleagues from the National Arts Centre Orchestra founded the National Capital String Academy to address this need. The National Capital Wind Academy was formed in 1985 to provide similar opportunities to wind and brass players. The two groups merged in 1986 as the National Capital Strings and Wind Academy, and re-established the Ottawa Youth Orchestra which had been dormant for six years.

The organization was incorporated as the National Capital Music Academy in 1988, and has gradually broadened its program over the years to become one of the most comprehensive of its kind in Canada.

As it entered its twenty-first year of operation under founding Music Director John Gomez, the National Capital Music Academy changed its corporate name to the Ottawa Youth Orchestra Academy (OYOA). The new name reflects their goal to provide young people with orchestral training opportunities while also honouring their origins, which went back 50 years.

Description
 
The original purpose in founding the Academy was to fulfill a need in the community for the training of young string players in ensemble playing. What has evolved not only fully meets this need but also provides the same opportunities to woodwind, brass and percussion students. The enrollment in the Academy is now about 350 and includes some of the best young musicians in the area. The Academy also offers a summer camp program. For all these musicians, aged between 3 and 18 years, the Academy adds the discipline, excitement, and satisfaction of working in ensembles to the solo study of their instruments.

To effectively support such an ambitious program, the Academy has established a full teaching structure providing instruction on the playing of strings, percussion, woodwinds, and brass instruments in an ensemble. The conductors and coaches are themselves all participants in the musical life of Ottawa, and many are also regular performers at the National Arts Centre.

The students of the OYOA regularly perform in the Kiwanis Music Festival, as part of their regular ensembles and also in smaller ensembles, as well as individually. In the past years, the students have represented the National Capital Region provincially and nationally as a result of winning their class in the local festival.

In addition to a well supported season of concerts featuring the OYO and OJYO, the OYOA sponsors two free family concerts each year at which all the ensembles perform.

References

External links 
 Ottawa Youth Orchestra Academy official website

Musical groups established in 1960
Musical groups from Ottawa
Canadian orchestras
Youth Orchestra Academy
1960 establishments in Ontario